Sirous Ahmadi is an Australian-Iranian businessman, researcher and athlete. He is known for his career in Australia.

Career
Ahmadi was a lecturer in Iran and he went to Australia to continue his graduate studies, but he had no plan to stay in Australia. While living in Sydney, he became interested in doing migration business as he guided his friends and relatives to migrate to Australia. After receiving his doctorate from the University of Sydney, he earned a graduate certificate in migration law from the Australian National University and since 2008, he is an Australian Immigration Consultant. Ahmadi is also a licensed immigration consultant in New Zealand. He is the founder and director of Visayab Company.

Books
 Immigration: Legal immigration solutions to Australia by maintaining ties with the home country, Tehran: Nakhostin 2016
 Muscle Oxygenation and Muscle Damage: Monitoring Muscle Oxygenation and Myoelectric Activity after Damage-Inducing Exercise, VDM Verlag 2008

References

Iranian businesspeople
Australian businesspeople
Living people
Year of birth missing (living people)
Australian sports physicians
Iranian sports physicians
University of Sydney alumni
Australian National University alumni
Shiraz University of Medical Sciences alumni